Below are the rosters for the 2004 CONMEBOL Men Pre-Olympic Tournament held in Chile. The ten national teams involved in the tournament were required to register a squad of 20 players; only players in these squads are eligible to take part in the tournament.

Players' names marked in bold have been capped at full international level.

Group A

Head coach:  Juvenal Olmos

Head coach:  Ricardo Gomes

Head coach:  Juan Ramón Carrasco 

(Source for player names:)

Head coach:  Carlos Jara Saguier 

(Source for player names:)

Head coach:  Ramón Hernández

 

 

 

(Source for player names:)

Group B

Head coach:  Marcelo Bielsa

Head coach:  Jaime de la Pava

(Source for player names:)

Head coach:  Paulo Autuori 

(Source for player names:)

Coach: José Jacinto Vega

Head coach:  Nelson Acosta

References

CONMEBOL Pre-Olympic Tournament